B. chinense may refer to:

 Bulbophyllum chinense, an orchid species
 Bupleurum chinense, a plant species found in East Asia

See also
 
 B. chinensis